Blackburn is a town in Lancashire, England.

Blackburn may also refer to:

Places

Australia
Blackburn, Victoria
Blackburn Lake Sanctuary, Victoria
Blackburn North, Victoria
Blackburn High School, Blackburn North
Blackburn South, Victoria
Blackburn Island, Lord Howe Island group, NSW

England
Blackburn (ancient parish), Lancashire
Blackburn (UK Parliament constituency), a constituency represented in the House of Commons
Blackburn Hundred, a former hundred of the traditional county of Lancashire
Blackburn with Darwen, a unitary authority in Lancashire
Blackburn, South Yorkshire, a UK location

Scotland
Blackburn, Aberdeenshire
Blackburn, Moray, a UK location
Blackburn, West Lothian

United States
Blackburn, Arkansas
Blackburn, Missouri
Blackburn, Oklahoma
Mount Blackburn (peak), Alaska
Blackburn College (Illinois)

Elsewhere
Blackburn, KwaZulu-Natal, South Africa, in eThekwini Metropolitan Municipality
Blackburne Airport, a former airport in Montserrat
Mount Blackburn (Antarctica)
Blackburn Hamlet, a neighbourhood of Ottawa, Canada

Other uses
Blackburn (surname), any of several people
5 Blackburn, a Heritage Canada Foundation building
Blackburn Aircraft, defunct British aircraft manufacturer
Blackburn College, Lancashire, England
Blackburn Hawks, an ice hockey team in Lancashire, England
Blackburn Riots, 1883, in Detroit, Michigan
Blackburn Rovers F.C., an English football team
Blackburn United F.C., a Scottish football team
Blackburne (motorcycles), a defunct British motorcycle manufacturer

See also 
 Blackburne (disambiguation)
 Blackburnian warbler (Setophaga fusca, a small New World bird
 Blackbourn, a surname
 Blackbourn Hundred